Angelique Corthals is a biomedical researcher and forensic anthropologist. She is an associate professor at John Jay College of Criminal Justice, City University of New York (CUNY). Her focus in biomedicine is the etiology of autoimmune diseases; recently she has been studying whether or not COVID-19 originated zoonotically in bats.

Career 
Angelique completed her DPhil (PhD) at University of Oxford, St. Cross College in 2003. She then held faculty and curatorial positions at the University of Manchester, the American Museum of Natural History, Stony Brook University, and was the scientific director of the Stony Brook BioBank. She is currently an associate professor at John Jay College of Criminal Justice, CUNY.

As a cross-disciplinary scientist, her publications and research span many different fields and fall into four main categories: 

- The role of metabolism in neurodegeneration, infectious diseases and aging
 
- New molecular and preservation protocols for specimens-based research, biobanking and field medicine

- Histomorphology, pathology and bioinformatics in Forensic Anthropology

- New infectious and non-transmissible diseases diagnostic technology solutions and clinical guidelines for Field Medicine in LMICs

Personal life 
Angelique grew up in Belgium and pursued degrees in violin and Slavonic studies before settling on biological anthropology.

She lives with her wife, Liliana M. Dávalos, on Long Island. As a lesbian, she is involved in visibility campaigns for LGBT+ people in STEM.

Angelique is also a rower and sabre fencer.

Filmography
Angelique Corthals has been involved both off and on camera in the IMAX movie 'Mummies: Secrets of the Pharaohs', Discovery Channel 's 'Secrets of Egypt's Lost Queen', National Geographic's Explorer series 'Child Mummy Sacrifice' and most recently, in Nova's 'Bat Superpowers'. She has been a consultant for the television series 'CSI' and 'Bones'. She has also been invited on numerous network television news broadcast as well as radio shows and various other media platforms.

Awards and Recognition

- 2022: Recognition by the Fond Christophe Plantin Prize for contribution to the prestige of Belgium abroad.

- 2004: Elected Fellow Resident of the Explorers Club.

Press
Bats, museums, and viruses collide in this scientific love story
Van archeologie tot microbiologie: deze Belgische topwetenschapper onderzoekt zowel farao’s als vleermuizen
New York City’s Deadliest Day From Covid-19 Hit One Year Ago
The Scientific Answer to Amelia Earhart is Lost in a Pile of Phantom Bones
Pneu-mummy-a: Comparing the protein profile of a 500-year-old Inca mummy to modern humans reveals an active lung infection prior to sacrifice
Disease Diagnosed in a 500-Year-Old Mummy
The King Herself: the discovery of Hatshepsut
A frail King Tut died from malaria, broken leg
Species in a Second: Promise of DNA ‘Bar Codes’
Is multiple sclerosis really an immune system disease?
Have we been looking at Multiple Sclerosis all wrong?

References

External Links
Angelique Corthals Official Website

Angelique Corthals at CUNY John Jay College

Living people
1973_births
British LGBT scientists
LGBT academics
Forensic anthropologists
Women academics
Women anthropologists
21st-century LGBT people
Belgian scientists
Fellows of the Explorers Club